Univision, formerly SIN (Spanish International Network), the biggest Spanish speaking TV channel of the US, was the OTI member station that organised the American participation in the OTI Festival. The network, whose main audience was the Spanish speaking community of the United States, debuted in the contest in 1974 in Acapulco with Rosita Perú and her song "Pero...mi tierra" (But... my homeland), which ended in the 17th place. Although the American broadcaster withdrawed from the event some years after its debut, Univision returned to the event and participated till the last edition in 2000 which was held again in Acapulco.

History 
The American representants in the OTI Festival were mainly American born Latino performers and bands, but sometimes, Univision opted to select famous singers from other Latin American countries. The country won the event for first time in 1986 with a trio composed by the performers Dámaris, Miguel Ángel Guerra and Eduardo Fabiani who performed the song "Todos" (Everybody) which sent a message of unity between the Latin community in the country. Univision got the second victory for the United States in Acapulco with the Chirino Sisters and their song "Mala hierba" (Bad grass) which turned into the very last victory in the history of the song contest before its defunction.

Apart from their victories, the United States managed to get two consecutive second places in 1977 in Madrid with Lissette Álvarez and her song "Si hay amor vendrá" (If there's love, he will come) and in 1978 in Santiago de Chile with Susy Lemán and her song "Ha vuelto ya" (He has already returned). Univision got another second place in 1992 in Valencia with Carlo de la Cima and his song "No te mueras, América" (Don't ever die, América).

In 1982, the American broadcaster got the third place with Laura Hevia and her song "Que equivocado" (How wrong).

Univision, hosted the OTI Festival on three occasions, the first one in 1983 in the Constitution Hall of Washington DC, which was presented by the Cubans Rafael Pineda and Anna Carlota. This edition of the festival was famous because the ceremony was opened by a message by the president of the US, Ronald Reagan sent to the Spanish speaking community which hailed their contribution to the cultural diversity of the United States of America.

The American broadcaster also hosted the event in 1989 in Miami having the James L. Knight Convention Center as the venue and in 1990 in the Caesars Palace of Las Vegas.

Contestants 
Table key

References 

OTI Festival
Univision